The Swedish Open is a darts tournament established in 1969, held in Malmö since 2013.

Results

Men

Women

References 
 https://mastercaller.com/tournaments/swedish-classic-men

External links
 https://dartswdf.com/tournaments/sweden-open
 Swedish Open

Darts tournaments
Sports competitions in Sweden